Marengo rattotensis is a species of spider of the genus Marengo. It is endemic to Sri Lanka. The species was first discovered from Rattota area of Matale District, hence the specific name.

References

Salticidae
Endemic fauna of Sri Lanka
Spiders of Asia
Spiders described in 2006